Tarrawingee may refer to:

Tarrawingee, New South Wales
Tarrawingee, Victoria